Gynotroches is a monotypic genus of trees in the family Rhizophoraceae. It contains the single species Gynotroches axillaris. The generic name  is from the Greek meaning "woman wheel", referring to the shape of the stigma. The specific epithet  is from the Latin, referring to the axillary position of the flowers.

Description
Its smooth bark is grey to blackish. The flowers are greenish white.

Distribution and habitat
Gynotroches axillaris grows naturally in the Nicobar Islands, Burma, Thailand, throughout Malesia, in Papuasia and in Pohnpei in the Federated States of Micronesia. Its habitat is by rivers and in sandy areas from sea-level to  altitude.

References

Rhizophoraceae
Flora of the Nicobar Islands
Trees of Myanmar
Trees of Thailand
Trees of Malesia
Trees of Papuasia
Flora of the Federated States of Micronesia
Monotypic Malpighiales genera